Pavlo Ushkvarok (born 6 July 1983) is a Ukrainian orienteering competitor. He competed at the 2013 World Orienteering Championships, and won a bronze medal in the relay with the Ukrainian team.

He was born in Kharkiv and represents the club KSO O-Kompas in Ukraine and OK Denseln in Sweden.

References

External links

1983 births
Living people
Ukrainian orienteers
Male orienteers
Foot orienteers
World Orienteering Championships medalists